MRAW may refer to:

 16S rRNA (cytosine1402-N4)-methyltransferase, an enzyme
 MraW RNA motif